Pfungwa Mahefu (born August 4, 1982) is a former Zimbabwean tennis player, who played mainly on the ITF Futures tournaments. 

In the 2005 Davis Cup he played against future world number one tennis player 17-year-old Novak Djokovic and lost 1–6, 2–6.

References
 http://www.daviscup.com/en/draws-results/tie/details.aspx?tieId=100006632

External links
 
  Mahefu profile on tennisexpolrer.com

Zimbabwean male tennis players
1982 births
Living people
Place of birth missing (living people)